Amber Forest Reserve is a wildlife reserve of Madagascar.

The name comes from the flowers of some trees, which cover the mountain and shine with amber from afar.

See also
 List of national parks of Madagascar
 Montagne d'Ambre National Park

References

External links
 Madagascar National Parks

1958 establishments in Madagascar
Diana Region
Forest reserves
Protected areas of Madagascar
Protected areas established in 1958
Madagascar subhumid forests